The Cambridgeshire was a greyhound racing competition held annually. It was inaugurated in 1936 at West Ham Stadium. 

Following the closure of West Ham in 1972 the competition switched to White City Stadium but only lasted until 1982 when it was discontinued following the closure of White City.

Past winners

Venues & Distances 
1936-1938	(West Ham 400 yards)
1942-1944	(West Ham 525 yards)
1945-1948	(West Ham 400 yards)
1949-1954	(West Ham  yards)
1955-1959	(West Ham 525 yards)
1960-1971	(West Ham 600 yards)
1972-1974 	(White City 550 yards)
1975-1982 	(White City 500 metres)

Sponsors
1979-1979 Haig

References

Greyhound racing competitions in the United Kingdom
Greyhound racing in London